Cruckton railway station was a station in Cruckton, Shropshire, England. The station was opened in 1913 and closed in 1933.

References

Further reading

Disused railway stations in Shropshire
Railway stations in Great Britain opened in 1913
Railway stations in Great Britain closed in 1933